Muruq'u (Quechua for ball (of yarn, wool), also spelled Morokho) is a   mountain in the Bolivian Andes. It is located in the Chuquisaca Department, Nor Cinti Province, San Lucas Municipality, east of the village of Canchas Blancas. It lies northwest of Kunturiri.

References 

Mountains of Chuquisaca Department